Arkansas Highway 309 (AR 309 and Hwy. 309) is a designation for two state highways in Western Arkansas. One route of  runs from Yell County Route 28 (CR 28) at Blue Mountain Lake northeast to Highway 10 at Waveland. A second segment begins at Highway 10 in Havana and winds northwest through the Ozark National Forest to Highway 23 at Webb City via Paris. A portion of the second route is designated as the Mount Magazine Scenic Byway, one of eleven Arkansas Scenic Byways maintained by the Arkansas State Highway and Transportation Department (AHTD).

Route description

Blue Mountain Lake to Waveland
Highway 309 begins at Yell County Route 28 near Blue Mountain Lake in Yell County. The route runs east and turns north to terminate at Highway 10. This alignment does not cross any other state highways. An average daily vehicle count from 2010 indicated that 630 vehicles per day use this segment of Highway 309.

Havana to Webb City

A second, longer routing of Highway 309 begins in Havana at Highway 10. The route begins north through the Ozark National Forest. The route runs near the Cove Creek Bridge, Burnett Springs, and the Cove Lake Bathhouse and Cove Lake Spillway Dam-Bridge near Cove Lake. The highway also passes over the Cove Creek Tributary Bridge prior to exiting the forest northbound to Paris.
Along this route lies the small town of Roseville. According to local folklore Roseville missed out on being the capital of Arkansas by only one vote. Whither this is true or not has never been proven, but this story has been passed down from generation to generation and survives til this day.

Upon entering the northern county seat of Logan County Highway 309 forms a concurrency with Highway 109 in south Paris, continuing north to Highway 22. This junction also contains Logan County Courthouse and the Paris Commercial Historic District on the National Register of Historic Places. Highway 309 continues north past the Methodist Episcopal Church, and Paris Post Office to exit town heading north. The route runs north, briefly along the Arkansas River before it enters Franklin County. The route runs almost due north to Webb City, where it terminates at Highway 23.

Mount Magazine Scenic Byway

A segment of  winds from Havana north through the Ozark National Forest to an area south of Paris. Recreation areas include Cove Lake and Mt. Magazine Recreation Areas, with views of Blue Mountain Lake available from an overlook. Many current camp sites are former home sites that were bought by the government during the depression.

Major intersections
Mile markers reset at concurrencies.

|-
| colspan="4" style="text-align:center;"|  concurrency north,

Former route

Highway 309 (AR 309, Ark. 309, and Hwy. 309) is a former route in Ozark. The route of  began at Highway 23 and ran east to Highway 219. It was redesignated as Highway 96 in 1991 due to traveler confusion with the existing section of Highway 309.

History
Highway 309 was first added to the state highway system as a  access road to the Ozark Municipal Airport by the Arkansas State Highway Commission on March 26, 1975. The Commission requested a study regarding extending the route east to Highway 219 on July 31, 1975, and requested an update to that study on March 22, 1978. Although the Commission requested the study's findings be reported at a later meeting, no record of the report's findings exist in subsequent meeting minutes between 1978 and June 1, 1991, when the Commission authorized the extension to Highway 219. Three months later, the Commission redesignated the highway as Highway 96 due to confusion between the two eastbound routes with junctions on Highway 23 within a few miles of each other.

Major intersections

See also

 List of state highways in Arkansas
 Arkansas Scenic Byways
 Mount Magazine State Park

References

External links

309
Transportation in Franklin County, Arkansas
Transportation in Logan County, Arkansas
Transportation in Yell County, Arkansas
Ozark–St. Francis National Forest